The Alliance, previously known as Alliance for Chile, is a coalition of  centre-right to right-wing Chilean political parties. The Alliance was replaced between 2009 and 2012 by the Coalition for Change and since 2015 by Chile Vamos.

It includes the National Renewal (Renovación Nacional, RN), the Independent Democratic Union (Unión Democrática Independiente, UDI) and since 2015 Political Evolution (Evolución Política, Evópoli). In the past it has included the National Party, the regional Party of the South (Partido del Sur) and the Union of the Centrist Center (Unión de Centro Centro, UCC), all of which are now defunct.

Major leaders of the Alliance have included Jovino Novoa (UDI), Pablo Longueira (UDI), Jaime Guzmán (UDI), Joaquín Lavín (UDI), Sebastián Piñera (RN), Lily Pérez (RN), Andrés Allamand (RN), Sergio Onofre Jarpa (RN), Sebastián Sichel, and Sergio Romero (RN).

Member parties
The Alliance has had several names through its history:

Electoral results

Electoral symbols

See also 

 List of political parties in Chile
 Centre-right coalition (Italy)
 Union of the Right and Centre
 Unite the Right (Canada)
 Coalition (Australia)

Political parties established in 1989
Political party alliances in Chile
Conservatism in Chile
1989 establishments in Chile